Doncaster East is a suburb of Melbourne, Victoria, Australia, 20 km east of Melbourne's Central Business District, located within the City of Manningham local government area. Doncaster East recorded a population of 30,926 at the 2021 census.

It is located in the hills between the Koonung Creek and the Mullum Mullum Creek. 

The suburb, which is situated on 11.4km2 of land, Doncaster East occupies a larger area than Doncaster, that they split from. Doncaster East is shaped like a reverse L, with the north-south part connecting with the Yarra River.

History

The area was originally occupied by the Wurundjeri, Indigenous Australians of the Kulin nation, who spoke variations of the Woiwurrung language group. After European settlement, the area was used for agriculture, predominantly orchards. A small settlement known as Waldau Village was established in the 1860s by predominantly German migrants. Those settlers planted the large swathes of pine trees to serve as windbreaks to protect the farmlands and orchards, those pine trees still exist today. German Lane was the original name for George Street, and Bismarck Street the original name for Victoria Street. The names were replaced during the First World War and the present names adopted with the wartime anti-German sentiments being an influential factor in removing German-influenced names from the local areas in favour of more overtly British names. 

The Post Office opened on 8 August 1887. A Tunstall Square office was open from 1965 until 1990.

Like much of the City of Manningham, Doncaster East was predominantly covered in fruit orchards for some time before subdivision began and it became a contiguous part of Melbourne. Housing estates began to replace orchards in the 1960s, generally along Doncaster Road, in the southern half of the suburb. The north half of the suburb was developed through the 1970s and 1980s, with the last orchard being removed in the 1990s. As the young parents who moved into these estates now retire and move away, many houses from the 60s and 70s were converted into multi-tenant units.

Geography

The area of land that is occupied by Doncaster East mostly consists of rolling hills, creek valleys and short ridges. Andersons Creek Road runs along an unnamed ridge that, when atop, gives views of Mount Dandenong to the east and the further rolling hills of Templestowe to the west.

Three main watercourses flow through or border the suburb:
Mullum Mullum Creek
Koonung Creek
 Ruffey Creek

The native vegetation of Doncaster East has been almost totally cleared, notable exceptions being the north-east of the suburb around the Mullum Mullum Creek, where small areas of native riparian bushland remain. Many small areas of Pine Trees were planted by early German settlers and can be found all over the suburb, particularly around George and Victoria Streets and to the south-east, the presence of these pine trees can serve as a good indicator of historical property boundaries and further may be present in the nature reserves and parks that populate the region. Invasive species remain as one of the suburbs major environmental problems.

Political geography
The suburb boundaries roughly form the shape of an L flipped horizontally, bordered by Wetherby Road, Victoria Street and Blackburn Road to the west, adjoining Doncaster and Templestowe, the Mullum Mullum Creek, Springvale Road and Tunstall Road in the east, adjoining Warrandyte and Donvale and the Koonung Creek to the south, adjoining Blackburn North. The north-east section of the suburb sits on the western side of the Mullum Mullum Valley and is very occasionally referred to as being whole or part of West Warrandyte and rarer still, East Templestowe. There are many small anecdotal localities that have established individual community identities within the suburb, some of these include:

Donburn – Around the Blackburn Road/Doncaster Road intersection.
Deep Creek – The northernmost area of the suburb, near the Mullum Mullum Creek.
Milgate – Milgate Park and surrounds.
Tunstall – Around Tunstall Square and Tunstall Road.
Waldau – Historically, the area surrounding George and Victoria Streets.
The Pines – The area north of The Pines Shopping Centre.

Traditional ownership 
The formally recognised traditional owners for the area in which Doncaster is located are the Wurundjeri people. The Wurundjeri people are represented by the Wurundjeri Woi Wurrung Cultural Heritage Aboriginal Corporation.

Demographics 
In the 2021 Census, there were 30,926 people living within Doncaster East.

Community
Doncaster East has had a significant Chinese minority for many years. Therefore, there are a number of Chinese restaurants, notable in quality and quantity for being outside Chinatown in Little Bourke Street.

The suburb contains many diverse places of worship servicing the Anglican, Baptist, Catholic, Gospel, Islamic and Uniting faiths.

Transportation

Public transportation in the City of Manningham consists of regular bus services that cover most of the suburb. Plans for a railway line to Doncaster East were scrapped by the Cain Labor Government and as a result local residents rely heavily on the use of cars.

The suburb is serviced primarily by the Eastern Freeway to the south and Reynolds Road in the north. Through traffic consists primarily of cars and buses traveling to neighbouring Warrandyte and Donvale through the use of Heidelberg – Warrandyte Road, Reynolds Road and Tindals Road (Old Warrandyte Road)

Within the suburban boundaries, Doncaster East is serviced by George Street, King Street and Victoria Street. Running north-south is Blackburn Road, which holds most of the flow of traffic during weekday peak hour times, together with Springvale Road, as residents travel from their homes to the Eastern Freeway and into the city.

Shopping 
Shopping Strips and Centres in Doncaster East include:
Stockland The Pines
Donburn Shops
Jackson Court
Devon Plaza
Commercial Services either side of Doncaster Road, near the intersection of Blackburn Road.
Tunstall Square

Education

 Beverley Hills Primary School, located on Cassowary Street, is a government primary school, established in 1959.
 Ss Peter & Paul's School, located on Beverley Street, is a Catholic primary school, established in 1960.
 Donburn Primary School, located on Colchester, is a government primary school, established in 1973.
 East Doncaster Secondary College, located on George Street, is a government secondary school, established in 1974.
 Our Lady of the Pines Primary School, located on Carbine Street and is behind Milgate Primary School, a Catholic primary school, established in 1978.
 Milgate Primary School, located on Landscape Drive, is a government primary school, established in 1982. It is half located in Donvale
 Doncaster Gardens Primary School, located on Sandhurst Avenue, is a government primary school, established in 1997 through the merging of Waldau Primary School and Doncaster East Primary School.

Development

The EastLink tollway project, which extends the Eastern Freeway to Ringwood and then south to join with the Monash and Mornington Peninsula Freeways, was completed and opened in 2008. It enables residents of Doncaster East increased ease of travel when travelling through Melbourne's eastern and south-eastern suburbs.

Certain areas of land are currently awaiting development, including the former Box Hill Institute of TAFE's East Doncaster campus, now a newly subdivided small housing estate and a large area surrounding the Cherry Hill Tavern, which is proposed for a reception centre.

There are several vacant blocks of land in the suburb, many surrounding The Pines Shopping Centre.

Sport and Recreation

The suburb contains many fitness and community recreational opportunities, such as an athletics track, three Australian rules football/cricket ovals, soccer grounds, small to medium commercial services, a childcare centre, kindergarten, library, indoor sporting facilities, various playgrounds, retirement villages, medical centres, a small community hall, and Donvale Rehabilitation Centre.

Many people are active members of certain clubs or facilities in Doncaster East. Popular activities include Hockey, Cricket, Scouts, Athletics, Football (AFL), Soccer, Lawn Bowls, Walking, Bike Riding and Dog Walking. The waters of the Mullum Mullum Creek are too shallow for swimming in the summer months, however, this does not stop exploration or walks on the paths around the creek.

The Doncaster Hockey Club was established in October 1974. The council first allowed them to start the club at Timber Ridge Reserve. It was later moved to George Street before being allowed to establish a home at Mullum Mullum Reserve where it is today. In 1985 it was the first Australian Club to have a synthetic turf. The club has had 6 Olympians at Doncaster, Chris Ciriello, Russell Ford, Andrew Smith, Lachlan and James Elmerand Joshua Simmonds . http://doncasterhockeyclub.com.au/about-us/club-history/

Doncaster Rovers Soccer Club (not to be confused with the English club of the same name) are based in Doncaster East. Founded in 1967, the club currently plays in Football Federation Victoria State League 2 South-East. The club plays its home games at Anderson Park.

The suburb also has an Australian Rules football team, The Doncaster East Sharks, competing in the Eastern Football League. The Manningham Cricket Club plays at Rieschiecks Reserve and competes in the Eastern Cricket Association MacGibbon Shield. The East Doncaster Cricket Club plays at Zerbes Reserve and competes in the Eastern Cricket Association Dunstan Shield (Turf).

Parks and gardens
Deep Creek Reserve (Baseball)
Linear Park Reserve
Prowes Reserve
The Pines Reserve
Mullum Mullum Creek Linear Park (Bicycle & Walking) – Mullum Mullum Creek Trail
Mullum Mullum Wetlands
Currawong Bush Park
Anderson Park (Soccer)
Pinehill Reserve
Landscape Drive Reserve
Milgate Park Estate
Cat Jump Park
Zerbes Reserve (Football Oval, Scouts/Guides & Proposed Skate Park)
Rieschiecks Reserve (Football Oval, Athletics, Scouts and Schramms Cottage)
Doncaster Reserve (Football Oval)
Bullen Street Reserve
St. Clems Reserve
Koonung Creek Park
Boronia Grove Reserve (Scouts)

Notable people
 Alisa Camplin – Aerial skier, Olympic gold medallist
 Adam Kingsley – AFL Coach, Greater Western Sydney Giants
 Isaac Quaynor – AFL player, Collingwood football club
 Michele Timms – Basketballer, Olympic silver medallist

See also
 City of Doncaster and Templestowe – Doncaster East was previously within this former local government area.
 Milgate Park Estate
 Doncaster
 List of Melbourne suburbs

References

Manningham Municipal Council Offices. See City of Manningham.

External links
Australian Places – Doncaster East
  Schramm's Cottage Museum

Suburbs of Melbourne
Suburbs of the City of Manningham
Suburbs in Australia